Tinodontidae is an extinct family of actively mobile mammals, endemic to what would now be North America, Asia, Europe, and Africa during the Jurassic and Cretaceous periods.

Taxonomy
Tinodontidae 
was named by Marsh (1887). It was assigned to Mammalia by Marsh (1887); and to Symmetrodonta by McKenna and Bell (1997). More recently, they have been recovered as more basal to symmetrodonts, though still within the mammalian crown-group.

References

Cretaceous mammals of North America
Jurassic mammals of North America
Early Jurassic first appearances
Early Cretaceous extinctions
Prehistoric mammal families